Borrelia garinii is a spirochete bacterium in the genus Borrelia.

References

Further reading

External links 
NCBI Taxonomy Browser - Borrelia
Borrelia burgdoferi B31 Genome Page
Borrelia Garinii PBi Genome Page
Borrelia Afzelli PKo Gemonme Page

garinii
Bacteria described in 1992